The Australia women's cricket team is scheduled to tour England in June and July 2023 to play the England women's cricket team to contest the Women's Ashes. The tour will consist of a single Women's Test match, three Women's Twenty20 Internationals (WT20Is) and three Women's One Day Internationals (WODIs). A points-based system will be used across all three formats of the tour to determine the winner of the Ashes. The Test match at Trent Bridge will be the first ever women's Test scheduled to be played over five days. Australia are the defending champions, having won the 2021–22 Women's Ashes series by 12–4.

Only Test

WT20I series

1st WT20I

2nd WT20I

3rd WT20I

WODI series

1st WODI

2nd WODI

3rd WODI

References

External links
 Series home at ESPN Cricinfo

Women's cricket tours of England
2023 in Australian cricket
2023 in English cricket
International cricket competitions in 2023
England 2023
cricket
2023 in women's cricket
The Women's Ashes